Pterynotus tripterus, common name : the three-winged murex, is a species of sea snail, a marine gastropod mollusk in the family Muricidae, the murex snails or rock snails.

Description
The shell size varies between 40 mm and 60 mm

Distribution
This species is distributed in the Red Sea and in the Western Pacific Ocean.

References

 Vine, P. (1986). Red Sea Invertebrates. Immel Publishing, London. 224 pp
 Merle D., Garrigues B. & Pointier J.-P. (2011) Fossil and Recent Muricidae of the world. Part Muricinae. Hackenheim: Conchbooks. 648 pp.
page(s): 124

External links
 

tripterus
Gastropods described in 1778